The Nuthe is a river in Brandenburg, Germany, left tributary of the Havel. The Nuthe originates in the Fläming region, near Niedergörsdorf. It flows north through Jüterbog, Luckenwalde, Trebbin and Saarmund. The Nuthe joins the Havel in central Potsdam.

It has been said that crossing the Nuthe three times in a row is good luck.

Rivers of Brandenburg
 
Rivers of Germany